The Floßbach (also Floßgraben or Floßkanal, formerly Flotzbach or Flotzbachgraben) is a man-made river  long. It is an orographically right-hand tributary of the Isenach in the German state of Rhineland-Palatinate. It was built in the 18th century to enable the timber rafting of firewood.

References

Literature 
 Wolfgang Kunz: Die Trift auf dem „Floßbach“. In: Derselbe, Henning Cramer, Wolfgang Fluck: Maxdorf. Geschichte und Natur. Knecht-Verlag, Landau, 2014, S. 147–165.
 Bernd-Stefan Grewe: Der versperrte Wald. Ressourcenmangel in der bayerischen Pfalz (1814–1870) (= Umwelthistorische Forschungen, Bd. 1). Böhlau Verlag, Cologne/Weimar/Vienna, 2004, pp. 292–302 (covers timber rafting in the Palatinate in general; for the Floßbach see p. 293).

External links 
 Wasserwirtschaftliches Gesamtkonzept für das Einzugsgebiet von Isenach und Eckbach (pdf; 2.9 MB)

Rivers of Rhineland-Palatinate
1Flossbach
Rhein-Pfalz-Kreis
Rivers of Germany